The Royal Botanic Gardens Victoria at Cranbourne Gardens, is a division of the Royal Botanic Gardens Victoria (the second division being the Royal Botanic Gardens, Melbourne, located in the centre of Melbourne). It is located in the suburb of Cranbourne, about 45 km south-east of the Melbourne city centre.

Cranbourne Gardens specialises in Australian native plants. The total area of this division of the botanic gardens is 363 hectares, including heathlands, wetlands and woodlands.  The gardens also provide habitat for native birds, mammals and reptiles, including some rare and endangered species.

A recent feature of the Cranbourne, is the specially constructed Australian Garden, opened to the public on 28 May 2006. The Australian Garden features a number of exhibition gardens, sculptures and displays aimed to bring the beauty and diversity of the Australian landscape and plants to the public.

Beyond the Australian Garden, the bushland section of the garden contains 10 km of walking tracks, and includes the Trig Point Lookout tower, secluded picnic sites and free barbecues.

History

The indigenous Australian Boon Wurrung people inhabited the area around Cranbourne in pre-European times. The site of Cranbourne Gardens was used for sand mining from as far back as the 1820s, largely to supply the building of Melbourne and its suburbs. The military used the site from 1889 until 1953, with private licences also issued for sand mining, grazing and timber gathering.

In 1970 the site was named as a division of the Royal Botanic Gardens Victoria, with a focus on Australian plant research and conservation. The gardens were not opened to the public until 1989. The Australian Garden was planned and developed over several years, finally opening to the general public on 30 May 2006, and attracting 15,000 visitors on the opening day.

The Australian Garden

The Australian Garden aims to allow visitors to explore people's place in the Australian environment and to learn more about Australian plants. It features about 100,000 plants spread across fifteen landscape displays and exhibition gardens.

The Australian Garden was designed by Taylor Cullity Lethlean Landscape Architects with Paul Thompson (Plant Design Pty Ltd). The Australian Garden has won a number of design awards already, but is still a work in progress, with a second stage covering an additional ten hectares scheduled to commence construction in late 2007 and to be completed by late 2011.

Red Sand Garden
The Red Sand Garden is the central feature of the Australian Garden. It features vibrant red sand with circles of saltbush and crescent shaped mounds designed to echo the shapes and colours found in Central Australia. The garden is designed to show seasonal flushes of wildflowers, as seen in the deserts of Central Australia.

Exhibition Gardens

There are five exhibition gardens aiming to demonstrate ways that Australian native plants can be used in the home garden.

The Diversity Garden illustrates a variety of native plants from various climatic zones in Australia. The Water Saving Garden shows how to group plants with similar water needs and choose plants which require minimum watering in a garden. The Future Garden features various alternate ways of gardening, such as special plant choices and novel mulches. The Home Garden shows a number of gardens featuring native plants for some common types of homes found in Australia. The Kid's Backyard uses natural plant materials recycled into a children's play area rather than the common plastic and metal constructions commonly found in Australian backyards.

Arid Garden and Dry River Bed

These gardens demonstrate the role of water in the Australian landscape. Many parts of Australia are prone to alternating drought and flood. Thus plants have had to evolve to cope with extended periods of intense heat and dry aridity, and with either seasonal or irregular copious supplies of water.

Eucalypt Walk
Eucalypts are an omnipresent feature of the Australian landscape, with around 700 species found in virtually all habitats. The Eucalypt Walk features five gardens displaying some well known eucalypt species, the Ironbark Garden, the Box Garden, the Peppermint Garden, the Bloodwood Garden, and the Stringybark Garden. These trees are currently in an immature state, but will continue to grow to mature trees over the next century.

Other features
The Rockpool Waterway and Escarpment Wall are inspired by the types of waterways and escarpments that may be found in parts of central Australia, such as Uluru and Kings Canyon. There is also a display of Australian orchids in an undercroft below the Visitor's Centre, the Serpentine Path, and a Desert Discovery Camp in the Arid Garden for children to play and learn.

The Australian Garden also has a visitor information service within the Visitor Centre, guided walks and educational programs, volunteer master gardeners to help with advice on the use of Australian plants, a gift shop and licensed café.

Visitor information

Opening hours

Cranbourne Gardens are open from 9.00 am to 5.00 pm every day of the year except for Christmas Day. Entry to the gardens is free. The bushland areas of the gardens are closed on days of Total Fire Ban.

Access

Cranbourne Gardens are at 1000 Ballarto Rd, Cranbourne. Access by private vehicle is via the South Gippsland Highway. Cranbourne is reasonably well served by public transportation, with a train line from Melbourne and a number of local bus routes. Access to the gardens if using public transport may however require a substantial walk and a taxi from Cranbourne Station is recommended.

References

Fawcett, T. 2006, 'A garden for the future', RoyalAuto, Vol. 74 No. 6.

Patrick, J. 2006, The Australian Garden, Gardening Australia, June.

External links

RBG, Cranbourne official website
 Taylor Cullity Lethlean Landscape Architects 

Botanical gardens in Victoria (Australia)
Royal Botanic Gardens Victoria
Parks in Melbourne
Tourist attractions in Melbourne
1989 establishments in Australia
City of Casey